Operation PANDORA (Russian: операция Пандора) is the name used by Russian defector Vasili Mitrokhin for an alleged active measure by the KGB against the United States during the Cold War.  The intention was supposedly to start a race war that would consume and self-destruct the United States.

According to British intelligence historian Christopher Andrew and Mitrokhin in the publication of the Mitrokhin Archive:The KGB ordered the use of explosives to exacerbate racial tensions in New York City. On July 25, 1971, the head of the KGB's FCD First (North American) Department, Anatoli Tikhonovich Kireyev, instructed the New York residency to proceed with the operation.  The KGB was to plant a delayed-action explosive package in "the Negro section of New York."  Kireyev's preferred target was "one of the Negro colleges." After the explosion the residency was ordered to make anonymous telephone calls to two or three black organizations, claiming that the explosion was the work of the Jewish Defense League.

See also
 Active measures
 Operation INFEKTION
 Operation Cedar (KGB)

Notes

KGB operations